Parliamentary elections were held in Ecuador on 6 June 1954.

Results

References

Elections in Ecuador
1954 in Ecuador
Ecuador
Election and referendum articles with incomplete results